Terthreutis kevini is a species of moth of the family Tortricidae. It is found in Thailand.

The wingspan is about 18 mm. The ground colour of the forewings is whitish, tinged with pale brownish, with brown strigulation (fine streaks). The terminal area is suffused with brownish ochreous. The hindwings are whitish cream, slightly mixed with ochreous on the periphery.

Etymology
The species is named in honour of Mr. Kevin R. Tuck.

References

Moths described in 2008
Archipini
Moths of Asia